ISBA or isba may refer to:

Organisations
 Illinois State Bar Association, US
 Indiana State Bar Association, US
 International Society for Bayesian Analysis
 Incorporated Society of British Advertisers, a UK industry association that under a previous name created the Audit Bureau of Circulations
  and the International School at the Banking Academy - in Vietnam.

Other uses
 Isba, an ancient city of Asia Minor
 Interaction soil–biosphere–atmosphere (model system), a land-surface parameterisation model scheme

See also
 Izba, a traditional Russian log house
 International Seabed Authority (ISA)